Jim Engles (born August 18, 1968) is an American college basketball coach and current coach of the Columbia Lions men's basketball team. He is the former head men's basketball coach at the New Jersey Institute of Technology (NJIT). He replaced Jim Casciano. In Engles' first season (2008), the NJIT Highlanders snapped their Division I-record 51-game losing streak with a win over Bryant. Under Engles, NJIT reached the CIT semifinals in both 2015 and 2016. Engles had been an assistant coach at Columbia before taking over as head coach at NJIT.

Head coaching record

References

1968 births
Living people
Basketball coaches from New York (state)
Sportspeople from Staten Island
College men's basketball head coaches in the United States
Columbia Lions men's basketball coaches
Dickinson Red Devils men's basketball players
NJIT Highlanders men's basketball coaches
Rider Broncs men's basketball coaches
Wagner Seahawks men's basketball coaches
American men's basketball players